The Tram in Volchansk is the primary transportation mode connecting the northern and southern regions of Sverdlovsk in Russia, specifically, the southern town of Volchansk and northern town of Lesnaya Volchanka. The tram has been in operation since December 31, 1951, and the system currently contains one line which is 7–8 kilometers long.

History
Volchansk is the smallest Russian town with a tram. It is located 2105 km east of Moscow and 452 km north of Yekaterinburg.  The Volchansk tram service started on December 31, 1951. At that time, Volchansk did not have the status of a "town". Reaching a peak population of around 36,000 people, it was declared a town in 1956.

At first, the line continued past Volchanka Depot to Opencast Colliery #5 (Razrez 5). This was closed in 1994 due to the theft of the trolley wire. There was also an inter-urban tram line to the neighboring town of Karpinsk, which had been working from 1953 to April 22, 1965. It was dismantled due to the transfer of a large walking excavator from Karpinsk to Volchansk along the road between these two towns.

Between November 7, 2020, and June 9, 2021, the tram system was suspended due to track repairs. However, the tram only runs on weekdays.

Rolling stock
The rolling stock consists of two tramcars; 71-608KM is numbered 1 and the 71-619KT is numbered 3. An additional service 71-605 is numbered 8.

Passenger tramcars are equipped with bow-type current collectors, which are suitable for operation on the existing catenary. It is planned to equip tramcars with modified pantographs adapted to work in local conditions.

The depot has a snow plow “GS-4” (no fleet number), though it is scrapped due to vandalism. Currently, a tractor is used to shovel snow off the track.

The body of a MTV-82 tramcar is used as a warehouse.

World Record claim
Although it is not verifiable through the Guinness Book of World Records, local lore claims Volchansk is the smallest city in the world to have its own independent, stand-alone tram system. Volchansk citizens have applied to the Russian Records Book in order to have an official confirmation of their town as being the smallest in Russia with its own tram service.

See also
List of town tramway systems in Russia

References

External links

 Volchansk Tramway as a part of the project World's Tram and Trolleybus Systems
 Volchansk at UrbanRail.net
 

Tram transport in Russia
Transport in Sverdlovsk Oblast
Railway lines opened in 1951